The Nickel Plate Limited, later known as the City of Cleveland and City of Chicago, was a passenger night train operated by the New York, Chicago and St. Louis Railroad (Nickel Plate) between Chicago and Buffalo, New York via Cleveland, Ohio, with through service to Hoboken, New Jersey (for New York City) via Binghamton and Scranton and the Delaware, Lackawanna and Western Railroad for the Buffalo-Hoboken segment. 

The Nickel Plate bestowed the name Nickel Plate Limited on an existing (unnamed) Chicago-New York service in April 1929. It was the first named Nickel Plate train since 1906. The Nickel Plate also added Pullman club cars and sleepers to compete with New York Central Railroad service (such as the Forest City) over the same route. The DL&W's New York Mail handled eastbound through cars between Buffalo and New York while the Phoebe Snow (before 1949, the Lackawanna Limited) handled cars westbound. Into the train's later years, it would offer the range of sleeper accommodations, from the open sections to the modern roomettes to a drawing room. The Nickel Plate trains would link with the DLW trains at Lackawanna Station in Buffalo.

In 1954 the Nickel Plate renamed the train: the westbound train became the City of Chicago while the eastbound train became the City of Cleveland. Through service to Hoboken ended in 1959. Both trains survived the Nickel Plate itself: service ended on September 10, 1965, a year after the Nickel Plate's 1964 merger with the Norfolk and Western Railway. They were the final remnants of the Nickel Plate's passenger service.

Major stops
The following are major station stops en route:
Chicago (La Salle Street)
Englewood
Fort Wayne
Lorain
Cleveland (Union Terminal)
Erie
Buffalo (Lackawanna Terminal)

References

External links
 The Nickel Plate Limited, August, 1950 timetable and consist at Streamliner Schedules

Passenger trains of the New York, Chicago and St. Louis Railroad
Named passenger trains of the United States
Night trains of the United States
Passenger rail transportation in Pennsylvania
Passenger rail transportation in New York (state)
Passenger rail transportation in Ohio
Passenger rail transportation in Indiana
Passenger rail transportation in Illinois
Railway services introduced in 1929
Railway services discontinued in 1965